Chubutolithes is an ichnogenus representing the fossil nests of a mud dauber.

References

Trace fossils